Vladimir Malik (Russian name: Владимир Малик; born 31 March 1938) is a Soviet rower. He competed at the 1960 Summer Olympics in Rome with the men's eight where they were eliminated in the heats.

References

1938 births
Living people
Soviet male rowers
Olympic rowers of the Soviet Union
Rowers at the 1960 Summer Olympics
Rowers from Saint Petersburg